Alafan is a district of the Simeulue Regency on Simeulue in the Indonesian province of Aceh. At the 2010 Census it had a total population of 4,479 people, living in 969 households in 2005.

Administrative divisions 
Alafan is divided administratively into 8 desa/kelurahan:

 Lewak
 Lamerem
 Serafon
 Lhok Pauh
 Langi
 Lubuk Baik
 Lhok Dalam
 Lafakha

References 

Districts of Aceh